Food is any substance consumed by an organism for nutritional support. Food is usually of plant, animal, or fungal origin, and contains essential nutrients, such as carbohydrates, fats, proteins, vitamins, or minerals. The substance is ingested by an organism and assimilated by the organism's cells to provide energy, maintain life, or stimulate growth. Different species of animals have different feeding behaviours that satisfy the needs of their metabolisms that have evolved to fill a specific ecological niche within specific geographical contexts.

Omnivorous humans are highly adaptable and have adapted to obtain food in many different ecosystems. The majority of the food energy required is supplied by the industrial food industry, which produces food with intensive agriculture and distributes it through complex food processing and food distribution systems. This system of conventional agriculture relies heavily on fossil fuels, which means that the food and agricultural system is one of the major contributors to climate change, accountable for as much as 37% of total greenhouse gas emissions. 

The food system has significant impacts on a wide range of other social and political issues including: sustainability, biological diversity, economics, population growth, water supply, and food security. Food safety and security are monitored by international agencies like the International Association for Food Protection, World Resources Institute, World Food Programme, Food and Agriculture Organization, and International Food Information Council.

Definition and classification 
Food is any substance consumed to provide nutritional support and energy to an organism. It can be raw, processed or formulated and is consumed orally by animals for growth, health or pleasure. Food is mainly composed of water, lipids, proteins and carbohydrates. Minerals (e.g. salts) and organic substances (e.g. vitamins) can also be found in food. Plants, algae and some microorganisms use photosynthesis to make their own food molecules. Water is found in many foods and has been defined as a food by itself. Water and fiber have low energy densities, or calories, while fat is the most energy dense component. Some inorganic (non-food) elements are also essential for plant and animal functioning.

Human food can be classified in various ways, either by related content or by how the food is processed. The number and composition of food groups can vary. Most systems include four basic groups that describe their origin and relative nutritional function: Vegetables and Fruit, Cereals and Bread, Dairy, and Meat. Studies that look into diet quality group food into whole grains/cereals, refined grains/cereals, vegetables, fruits, nuts, legumes, eggs, dairy products, fish, red meat, processed meat, and sugar-sweetened beverages. The Food and Agriculture Organization and World Health Organization use a system with nineteen food classifications: cereals, roots, pulses and nuts, milk, eggs, fish and shellfish, meat, insects, vegetables, fruits, fats and oils, sweets and sugars, spices and condiments, beverages, foods for nutritional uses, food additives, composite dishes and savoury snacks.

Food sources 

In a given ecosystem, food forms a web of interlocking chains with primary producers at the bottom and apex predators at the top. Other aspects of the web include detrovores (that eat detritis) and decomposers (that break down dead organisms). Primary producers include algae, plants, bacteria and protists that acquire their energy from sunlight. Primary consumers are the herbivores that consume the plants, and secondary consumers are the carnivores that consume those herbivores. Some organisms, including most mammals and birds, diet consists of both animals and plants, and they are considered omnivores. The chain ends with the apex predators, the animals that have no known predators in its ecosystem. Humans are considered apex predators.

Humans are omnivores, finding sustenance in vegetables, fruits, cooked meat, milk, eggs, mushrooms and seaweed. Cereal grain is a staple food that provides more food energy worldwide than any other type of crop. Corn (maize), wheat, and rice account for 87% of all grain production worldwide. Just over half of the world's crops are used to feed humans (55 percent), with 36 percent grown as animal feed and 9 percent for biofuels. Fungi and bacteria are also used in the preparation of fermented foods like bread, wine, cheese and yogurt.

Sunlight and soil 
Photosynthesis is the ultimate source of energy and food for nearly all life on earth. It is the main food source for plants, algae and certain bacteria. Without this, all organisms which depend on these organisms further up the food chain would be unable to exist, from coral to lions. Energy from the sun is absorbed and used to transform water and carbon dioxide in the air or soil into oxygen and glucose. The oxygen is then released, and the glucose stored as an energy reserve. 

Plants also absorb important nutrients and minerals from the air, water and soil. Carbon, oxygen and hydrogen are absorbed from the air or water and are the basic nutrients needed for plant survival. The three main nutrients absorbed from the soil for plant growth are nitrogen, phosphorus and potassium, with other important nutrients including calcium, sulfur, magnesium, iron boron, chlorine, manganese, zinc, copper molybdenum and nickle.

Plants

Plants as a food source are divided into seeds, fruits, vegetables, legumes, grains and nuts. Where plants fall within these categories can vary, with botanically described fruits such as the tomato, squash, pepper and eggplant or seeds like peas commonly considered vegetables. Food is a fruit if the part eaten is derived from the reproductive tissue, so seeds, nuts and grains are technically fruit. From a culinary perspective, fruits are generally considered the remains of botanically described fruits after grains, nuts, seeds and fruits used as vegetables are removed. Grains can be defined as seeds that humans eat or harvest, with cereal grains (oats, wheat, rice, corn, barley, rye, sorghum and millet) belonging to the Poaceae (grass) family and pulses coming from the Fabaceae (legume) family. Whole grains are foods that contain all the elements of the original seed (bran, germ, and endosperm). Nuts are dry fruits, distinguishable by their woody shell.

Fleshy fruits (distinguishable from dry fruits like grain, seeds and nuts) can be further classified as stone fruits (cherries and peaches), pome fruits (apples, pears), berries (blackberry, strawberry), citrus (oranges, lemon), melons (watermelon, cantaloupe), Mediterranean fruits (grapes, fig), tropical fruits (banana, pineapple). Vegetables refer to any other part of the plant that can be eaten, including roots, stems, leaves, flowers, bark or the entire plant itself. These include root vegetables (potatoes and carrots), bulbs (onion family), flowers (cauliflower and broccoli), leaf vegetables (spinach and lettuce) and stem vegetables (celery and asparagus).

Plants have high carbohydrate, protein and lipid content, with carbohydrates mainly in the form of starch, fructose, glucose and other sugars. Most vitamins are found from plant sources, with exceptions of vitamin D and vitamin B12. Minerals are also plentiful, although the presence of phytates can prevent their release. Fruit can consist of up to 90% water, contain high levels of simple sugars that contribute to their sweet taste, and have a high vitamin C content. Compared to fleshy fruit (excepting Bananas) vegetables are high in starch, potassium, dietary fiber, folate and vitamins and low in fat and calories. Grains are more starch based and nuts have a high protein, fibre, vitamin E and B content. Seeds are a good source of food for animals because they are abundant and contain fibre and healthful fats, such as omega-3 fats.

Animals that only eat plants are called herbivores, with those that mostly just eat fruits known as frugivores, leaves, while shoot eaters are folivores (pandas) and wood eaters termed xylophages (termites). Frugivores include a diverse range of species from annelids to elephants, chimpanzees and many birds. About 182 fish consume seeds or fruit. Animals (domesticated and wild) use as many types of grasses that have adapted to different locations as their main source of nutrients.

Humans only eat about 200 out of the worlds 400 000 plant species, despite at least half of them being edible. Most human plant-based food comes from maize, rice, and wheat. Plants can be processed into breads, pasta, cereals, juices and jams or raw ingredients such as sugar, herbs, spices and oils can be extracted. Oilseeds are pressed to produce rich oils—⁣sunflower, flaxseed, rapeseed (including canola oil) and sesame.

Many plants and animals have coevolved in such a way that the fruit is a good source of nutrition to the animal who then excretes the seeds some distance away, allowing greater dispersal. Even seed predation can be mutually beneficial, as some seeds can survive the digestion process. Insects are major eaters of seeds, with ants being the only real seed dispersers. Birds, although being major dispersers, only rarely eat seeds as a source of food and can be identified by their thick beak that is used to crack open the seed coat. Mammals eat a more diverse range of seeds, as they are able to crush harder and larger seeds with their teeth.

Animals

Animals are used as food either directly or indirectly. This includes meat, eggs, shellfish and dairy products like milk and cheese. They are an important source of protein and are considered complete proteins for human consumption as they contain all the essential amino acids that the human body needs. One  steak, chicken breast or pork chop contains about 30 grams of protein. One large egg has 7 grams of protein. A  serving of cheese has about 15 grams of protein. And 1 cup of milk has about 8 grams of protein. Other nutrients found in animal products include calories, fat, essential vitamins (including B12) and minerals (including zinc, iron, calcium, magnesium).

Food products produced by animals include milk produced by mammary glands, which in many cultures is drunk or processed into dairy products (cheese, butter, etc.). Eggs laid by birds and other animals are eaten and bees produce honey, a reduced nectar from flowers that is used as a popular sweetener in many cultures. Some cultures consume blood, such as in blood sausage, as a thickener for sauces, or in a cured, salted form for times of food scarcity, and others use blood in stews such as jugged hare.

Taste 

Animals, specifically humans, typically have five different types of tastes: sweet, sour, salty, bitter, and umami.  The differing tastes are important for distinguishing between foods that are nutritionally beneficial and those which may contain harmful toxins. As animals have evolved, the tastes that provide the most energy are the most pleasant to eat while others are not enjoyable, although humans in particular can acquire a preference for some substances which are initially unenjoyable. Water, while important for survival, has no taste.

Sweetness is almost always caused by a type of simple sugar such as glucose or fructose, or disaccharides such as sucrose, a molecule combining glucose and fructose. Sourness is caused by acids, such as vinegar in alcoholic beverages. Sour foods include citrus, specifically lemons and limes. Sour is evolutionarily significant as it can signal a food that may have gone rancid due to bacteria. Saltiness is the taste of alkali metal ions such as sodium and potassium. It is found in almost every food in low to moderate proportions to enhance flavor. Bitter taste is a sensation considered unpleasant characterised by having a sharp, pungent taste. Unsweetened dark chocolate, caffeine, lemon rind, and some types of fruit are known to be bitter. Umami, commonly described as savory, is a marker of proteins and characteristic of broths and cooked meats. Foods that have a strong umami flavor include cheese, meat and mushrooms.

While most animals taste buds are located in their mouth, some insects taste receptors are located on their legs and some fish have taste buds along their entire body. Dogs, cats and birds have relatively few taste buds (chickens have about 30), adult humans have between 2000 to 4000, while catfish can have more than a million. Herbivores generally have more than carnivores as they need to tell which plants may be poisonous. Not all mammals share the same tastes: some rodents can taste starch, cats cannot taste sweetness, and several carnivores (including hyenas, dolphins, and sea lions) have lost the ability to sense up to four of the five taste modalities found in humans.

Digestion 

Food is broken into nutrient components through digestive process. Proper digestion consists of mechanical processes (chewing, peristalsis) and chemical processes (digestive enzymes and microorganisms). The digestive systems of herbivores and carnivores are very different as plant matter is harder to digest. Carnivores mouths are designed for tearing and biting compared to the grinding action found in herbivores. Herbivores however have comparatively longer digestive tracts and larger stomachs to aid in digesting the cellulose in plants.

See also

References

Further reading
 Collingham, E.M. (2011).  The Taste of War: World War Two and the Battle for Food
 Katz, Solomon (2003). The Encyclopedia of Food and Culture, Scribner
 Mobbs, Michael (2012). Sustainable Food Sydney: NewSouth Publishing,  
 Nestle, Marion (2007). Food Politics: How the Food Industry Influences Nutrition and Health, University Presses of California, revised and expanded edition, 
  The Future of Food (2015).  A panel discussion at the 2015  Digital Life Design (DLD) Annual Conference. "How can we grow and enjoy food, closer to home, further into the future? MIT Media Lab's Kevin Slavin hosts a conversation with food artist, educator, and entrepreneur Emilie Baltz, professor Caleb Harper from MIT Media Lab's CityFarm project, the Barbarian Group's Benjamin Palmer, and Andras Forgacs, the co-founder and CEO of Modern Meadow, who is growing 'victimless' meat in a lab. The discussion addresses issues of sustainable urban farming, ecosystems, technology, food supply chains and their broad environmental and humanitarian implications, and how these changes in food production may change what people may find delicious ... and the other way around."  Posted on the official YouTube Channel of DLD

External links

 Cookbook – Wikibooks
 Food, BBC Radio 4 discussion with Rebecca Spang, Ivan Day and Felipe Fernandez-Armesto (In Our Time, 27 December 2001)
 
  of Food Timeline
 

 
Food watchlist articles